Tesfalem Tekle (born 9 October 1993) is an Eritrean footballer. He played for the Eritrea national team in the 2014 FIFA World Cup qualifiers. He is known to be the first Eritrean goal scorer in a FIFA World Cup Qualifiers.

International career

International goals
Scores and results list Eritrea's goal tally first.

References 

1993 births
Living people
Eritrean footballers
Eritrea international footballers
Association football midfielders
FC Al Tahrir players
Sportspeople from Asmara
Eritrean Premier League players